Ittihad Baladiat Lakhdaria, known as IB Lakhdaria or simply IBL for short, is an Algerian football club located in Lakhdaria, Algeria. The club was founded in 1929 and its colours are red and white. Their home stadium, Mansour Khoudja Stadium, has a capacity of 5,000 spectators. The club currently plays in the Inter-Régions Division.

On August 5, 2020, IB Lakhdaria promoted to the Algerian Ligue 2.

Current squad

References

External links

Football clubs in Algeria
Sports clubs in Algeria